Phatthalung Province Stadium is a multi-purpose stadium in Phatthalung Province, Thailand. It is currently used mostly for football matches and is the home stadium of Phatthalung F.C.

Multi-purpose stadiums in Thailand